The women's javelin throw at the 1950 European Athletics Championships was held in Brussels, Belgium, at Heysel Stadium on 23 August 1950.

Medalists

Results

Final
23 August

Participation
According to an unofficial count, 13 athletes from 10 countries participated in the event.

 (1)
 (1)
 (1)
 (1)
 (1)
 (1)
 (3)
 (2)
 (1)
 (1)

References

Javelin throw
Javelin throw at the European Athletics Championships
Euro